Clay Township is a township in Polk County, Iowa, United States.

History
Clay Township was established in 1878.

References

Townships in Polk County, Iowa
Townships in Iowa
1878 establishments in Iowa
Populated places established in 1878